Makwiro is a settlement in Mashonaland West province in Zimbabwe.

Populated places in Mashonaland West Province
This is where the Katiyo Estate farm is situated.